Lars Johansson (born 11 July 1987) is a Swedish professional ice hockey goaltender currently playing for Frölunda HC of the Swedish Hockey League (SHL). His brother, Martin, is a skier and orienteer.

Playing career
Johansson played in his native Sweden in the Swedish Hockey League with Mora IK and Frölunda HC. In the 2015–16 season with Frölunda, his third season as the club's starting goaltender, Johansson led the league in Goals against average and save percentage. He backstopped the Indians to the SHL championship, completing the double in having claimed the Champions Hockey League before the season.

On 23 May 2016, Johansson signed as an undrafted free agent to a one-year contract with the Chicago Blackhawks of the National Hockey League. In the 2016–17 season, his first on North American soil, Johansson was assigned to AHL affiliate, the Rockford IceHogs. After 16 games with the IceHogs, Johansson was called up to backup Scott Darling after Corey Crawford's appendectomy on 4 December 2016. He was returned without making an NHL appearance and played out the remainder of the season with the IceHogs.

On 3 July 2017, Johansson left the Blackhawks organization in agreeing to a one-year deal with Russian club, CSKA Moscow of the Kontinental Hockey League (KHL).

After five seasons in the KHL between CSKA and SKA Saint Petersburg, Johansson left Russia following the 2021–22 season and returned to his previous club, Frölunda HC of the SHL, in agreeing to a three-year contract on 13 May 2022.

Awards and honors

References

External links

1987 births
Living people
HC CSKA Moscow players
Frölunda HC players
Mora IK players
Rockford IceHogs (AHL) players
SKA Saint Petersburg players
Swedish ice hockey goaltenders
VIK Västerås HK players
Ice hockey players at the 2022 Winter Olympics
Olympic ice hockey players of Sweden